Belcheh Sur (also Romanized as Belcheh Sūr; also known as Belīcheh Sūr, Bīlcheh Sar, Bīlcheh Sūr, and Bilchehsūr) is a village in Kumasi Rural District, in the Central District of Marivan County, Kurdistan Province, Iran. At the 2006 census, its population was 268, in 61 families. The village is populated by Kurds.

References 

Towns and villages in Marivan County
Kurdish settlements in Kurdistan Province